The 2015 Safeway Championship, Manitoba's provincial men's curling championship, was held from February 4 to 8 at the Keystone Centre in Brandon, Manitoba. The winning Reid Carruthers team represented Manitoba at the 2015 Tim Hortons Brier in Calgary.

Teams
Teams are as follows:

Draw
32 team double knockout with playoff round
Four teams qualify each from A Event and B Event

A Event

B Event

Playoffs

Playoff round
8 team double knockout
Four teams qualify into Championship Round

Championship Round

1 vs. 2
Saturday, February 7, 7:00 pm

3 vs. 4
Saturday, February 7, 7:00 pm

Semifinal
Sunday, February 8, 9:00 am

Final
Sunday, February 8, 2:30 pm

References

2015 Tim Hortons Brier
Curling competitions in Brandon, Manitoba
2015 in Manitoba
February 2015 sports events in Canada